Jane Annie Collier (28 September 1869–13 October 1955) was a New Zealand teacher of the blind and church worker. She was born in Springston, North Canterbury, New Zealand on 28 September 1869.

References

1869 births
1955 deaths
New Zealand educators